Ivica Skelin (born 19 September 1973) is a Croatian professional basketball coach who is the current head coach for Telenet Giants Antwerp of the BNXT League.

Coaching career

Early years
Skelin started his club coaching career with Verviers-Pepinster in Belgium as an assistant coach in 2001, at which position he served until 2004, after that he coached youth teams for the Belgian club.

In 2005 Skelin was named the head coach of KK Split. He coached the team one year, after that he went back to Verviers-Pepinster, this time as head coach serving for two seasons.

From 2008 to 2010 he was the head coach of the Leuven Bears. In 2010 he returned to Verviers-Pepinster once again for one season as head coach.

Netherlands
After being named as an assistant coach with the Belgian club Spirou in the 2010–11 season Skelin became the head coach for the Dutch club GasTerra Flames of the Dutch Basketball League (DBL) in December 2012. Skelin was signed as a replacement for coach Hakim Salem, fired due to disappointing results. After the season he signed an extension for two more years with the club. In the 2013–14 season, Skelin won the double, both the DBL and NBB Cup, with the Flames.

Split
Skelin signed as head coach of his hometown club Split once again, in November 2015. On 29 May 2018 his contract expired and he left the club and was replaced by new coach Vladimir Anzulović.

Return to the Netherlands
On 4 September 2018 Skelin returned to the Netherlands by signing a one-year contract with the New Heroes Den Bosch. Under him, the Heroes finished third in the regular season and were eliminated in the semifinals by the later champions Landstede. His contract was not renewed after the season.

Return to Split
On 8 December 2019 following the departure of Ante Grgurević, Skelin was appointed as the head coach of Split for the third time in his coaching career. Under his leadership the club managed to secure its place in the 2020–21 ABA League First Division and win the second place of the 2021 Croatian National Cup.

On 17 February 2021 following a 70–79 loss to Zadar in the national cup final, Skelin was fired from Split.

Poland
On June 9, 2021, he has signed with Twarde Pierniki Toruń of the Polish Basketball League.

Antwerp Giants
On May 10, 2022, Skelin signed a 2-year contract with Telenet Giants Antwerp of the BNXT League. On 12 March 2023, Skelin and the Giants won the Belgian Cup after beating BC Oostende in the final.

Coaching record

Dutch Basketball League
Including regular season games.

|-
| align="left"|GasTerra Flames
| align="left" |2012–13
|36||26||10|||| align="center" | Eliminated in semi-finals
|- bgcolor=#ffc 
| align="left" |GasTerra Flames
| align="left" |2013–14
|36||32||4|||| align="center" | Champions
|-
| align="left" |Donar
| align="left" |2014–15
|28||21||7|||| align="center" | Eliminated in finals
|-
|-class="sortbottom"
| align="center" colspan=2|Career||100||79||21||||

National team coaching

Croatia
From 2011 to 2014 and again from 2016 to 2017 Skelin served as an assistant coach of the senior Croatia men's national team under head coaches Josip Vranković, Jasmin Repeša and Aleksandar Petrović.

On 15 September 2017 following unsuccessful EuroBasket tournament and departure of Aleksandar Petrović, Skelin was named the head coach of the Croatia national team. He was sacked by the Croatian Basketball Federation on 8 March 2018.

References

1973 births
Living people
Croatian basketball coaches
Basketball players from Split, Croatia
Donar (basketball club) coaches
Dutch Basketball League coaches
KK Split coaches
Leuven Bears coaches
RBC Verviers-Pepinster coaches